Dorcopsoides is a genus of extinct species of kangaroo from the Pliocene of Australia.

Description 
Dorcopsoides was described in 1967 from the well-preserved lower jaw, skull fragments and occipital found in the Upper Miocene Alcoota Fossil Beds north-east of Alice Springs in the Northern Territory. It was part of the Alcoota local fauna, which also included zygomaturine diprotodonts, a type of mihirung (Ilbandornis), a crocodile (Baru) and the giant thylacine, Thylacinus potens.

It was about the size of a gray and black four-eyed opossum. The generic name (Dorcopsoides) indicates a resemblance to forest wallabies (Dorcopsis) now living in New Guinea and neighboring islands.

References

Prehistoric macropods
Pliocene marsupials
Miocene marsupials
Miocene mammals of Australia
Pliocene mammals of Australia
Prehistoric marsupial genera